Krivdino is a rural locality (a village) in Bavlenskoye Rural Settlement, Kolchuginsky District, Vladimir Oblast, Russia. The population was 2 as of 2010.

Geography 
Krivdino is located on the Ilmovka River, 26 km northeast of Kolchugino (the district's administrative centre) by road. Glyadki is the nearest rural locality.

References 

Rural localities in Kolchuginsky District